Chaudhry Muhammad Arshad Jutt is a Pakistani politician who was a Member of the Provincial Assembly of the Punjab, from 2002 to May 2018.

Early life and education
He was born on 20 April 1970 in Chichawatni.

He has a degree of Bachelor of Arts and a degree of Bachelor of Law which he obtained in 2001 from Bahauddin Zakariya University.

Political career

He was elected to the Provincial Assembly of the Punjab as a candidate of Pakistan Peoples Party (PPP) from Constituency PP-225 (Sahiwal-VI) in 2002 Pakistani general election. He received 35,198 votes and defeated Muhammad Munir Azhar.

He was re-elected to the Provincial Assembly of the Punjab as a candidate of Pakistan Muslim League (Q) (PML-Q) from Constituency PP-225 (Sahiwal-VI) in 2008 Pakistani general election. He received 36,398 votes and defeated Rai Muhammad Murtaza Iqbal, an independent candidate.

He was re-elected to the Provincial Assembly of the Punjab as a candidate of Pakistan Muslim League (N) (PML-N) from Constituency PP-225 (Sahiwal-VI) in 2013 Pakistani general election. He received 45,689 votes and defeated Rai Muhammad Murtaza Iqbal, a candidate of Pakistan Tehreek-e-Insaf (PTI). In the same election, he also ran for the seat of the Provincial Assembly of the Punjab as an independent candidate from Constituency PP-226 (Sahiwal-VII) but was unsuccessful. He received 94 votes and lost the seat to Chaudhry Muhammad Hanif.

References

Living people
1970 births
Pakistan Muslim League (Q) politicians
Pakistan Muslim League (N) politicians
Pakistan People's Party politicians
Punjab MPAs 2002–2007
Punjab MPAs 2008–2013
Punjab MPAs 2013–2018
Bahauddin Zakariya University alumni
People from Chichawatni